Karl Martin Norum (1852—1911) was a Norwegian architect, best known for his many church buildings, as well as contributions to the reconstruction after the fire in the city of Ålesund in 1904. Norum is well known for his Art Nouveau and Dragestil designs.

Norum was born in 1852 in Levanger, Norway. He was educated at the Trondheim Technical College from 1872 to 1875. From 1875 to 1880, he worked for the Rørosbanen railway line as a surveyor during the construction of the railway line. In 1880, he was hired as a draftsman for the architectural firm of Jakob Digre in Trondheim. In 1884, he was hired as an assistant in the engineering office for the city of Trondheim.

In 1886, he was hired as the chief architect and designer for the architectural firm of Jakob Digre, where he worked earlier in his career. The firm had several architects and Norum worked here for 25 years. During this time, Norum was known for the dragestil style of many of the church buildings he designed such as Stangvik Church (1896), Frei Church (1897), Sortland Church (1901), Steinkjer Church (1902), Neiden Church (1902), Levanger Church (1902), Namsos Church (1903), Buksnes Church (1905), Veøy Church (1907), Holm Church (1907). He was also involved in the renovation of the Hammerfest Church in 1892.

In Trondheim, Norum was also the designer of a number of public and industrial buildings such as the Britannia Hotel (1895), Mathesongården (1898), Hjorten Revue and Variety Theater restaurant (1899), the Bødtker family's villa Kvernbekken (1902), the local Masonic Lodge, Trondheim hospital on Øya (1902),  the main post office (1911), and Tollboden (1911). Most were in designed in an Art Nouveau and built out of stone.

He also designed the commercial building "Carl E. Rønneberg & Sønner" on Noteneset.

Media gallery

References

1852 births
1911 deaths
Norwegian ecclesiastical architects
Architects from Trondheim